Nikolayevsky District may refer to:
Nikolayevsky District, Russia, name of several districts in Russia
Mykolaiv Raion, Lviv Oblast, a former district of Lviv Oblast, Ukraine
Mykolaiv Raion, Mykolaiv Oblast, a district of Mykolaiv Oblast, Ukraine
Mykolaivka Raion, a district of Odessa Oblast, Ukraine

See also
Nikolayevsky (disambiguation)
Nikolayevsk (disambiguation)
Nikolayev (disambiguation)